The Laub–Petschnikoff Stradivarius of 1722 is an antique violin fabricated by Italian  luthier Antonio Stradivari of Cremona (1644-1737).  It is one of only 700 known extant Stradivarius instruments in the world today.

It was once owned and played by Ferdinand Laub (1832-1875) and later by Alexander Petschnikoff (1873-1948).  In the early 1960s, The Laub-Petschnikof was acquired by Rembert Wurlitzer, a New York City dealer of fine string instruments.  It was then purchased by Canadian philanthropist J.W. McConnell, who donated the instrument to the Montreal Symphony Orchestra for use by concertmaster Calvin Sieb.

See also
Stradivarius

1722 works
Stradivari violins
Stradivari instruments